Hazel Moore OBE is a mergers and
acquisitions and venture capital specialist. Hazel Moore is the co-founder and chairman of FirstCapital, an investment bank which provides mergers and acquisitions, private equity and growth capital advice to high growth technology companies.

Career 
Moore studied Natural Sciences at Corpus Christi College, University of Cambridge, graduating in 1990. After a short period working as an engineer for GEC Marconi, Moore went to Hong Kong and joined WI Carr as an equity analyst.

Returning to the UK in 1995, Moore went on to co-found FirstCapital in 1999 with current CEO Jason Purcell.

From 2012-2018 Moore was a Governing Board member of Innovate UK; the UK's national innovation agency.

In June 2019 Moore was appointed as a non-executive director to the Board of British Patient Capital; a £2.5bn fund of funds investing in venture and growth capital funds.

Awards 
Moore received an OBE in the 2017 New Year's Honours list for services to Entrepreneurship and Innovation. She was given her OBE by Prince Charles at Buckingham Palace on 17 February 2017.

Moore was named as one of the most influential women in mid-market M&A by Mergers and Acquisitions in February 2019.

References 

Living people
Alumni of the University of Cambridge
Officers of the Order of the British Empire
Year of birth missing (living people)